The Mangatoro River or Mangatoro Stream is a river of the Hawke's Bay region of  New Zealand. It runs northeast along the western edge of the Puketoi Range to reach the Manawatū River south of Dannevirke at Okarae.

See also
List of rivers of New Zealand

References

Rivers of the Hawke's Bay Region
Rivers of New Zealand